Vrhovje is a small settlement in the Municipality of Cerklje na Gorenjskem in the Upper Carniola region of Slovenia. In 2017 it had a population of six.

References

External links

Vrhovje at Geopedia

Populated places in the Municipality of Cerklje na Gorenjskem